The Hartford Wits were a group of young writers from Connecticut in the late eighteenth century and included John Trumbull, Timothy Dwight, David Humphreys, Joel Barlow and Lemuel Hopkins. Originally the Connecticut Wits, this group formed in the late eighteenth century as a literary society at Yale College and then assumed a new name, the Hartford Wits. Their writings satirized an outmoded curriculum and, more significantly, society and the politics of the mid-1780s.

Over the span of American Revolution 

Their dissatisfaction with the Articles of Confederation appeared in The Anarchiad (1786–1787), written by Humphreys, Joel Barlow, Trumbull (the oldest Wit), and Hopkins. In satirizing democratic society, this mock-epic promoted the federal union delineated by the 1787 Federal Convention at Philadelphia.

Despite writing in a satiric tone, some of the Wits—in particular, Humphreys and Barlow—joined the Continental army.
 Moreover, Dwight became a minister, serving as chaplain to the Connecticut Continental Brigade along with writing poems and songs. He wrote several songs devoted to the soldiers of the Revolution, including “Columbia”:
Columbia, Columbia, to glory rise,
The queen of the world, and the child of the skies!
Trumbull was the only member of the Wits who did not join to the Continental Army and wrote a satiric poem called "M’Fingal" where the British cause was mocked. Simultaneously, Humphreys became colonel of the Continental Army and published “Address to the Armies of the United States of America” along with other patriotic poems.

Later careers
The Connecticut Wits eventually followed their interests in divergent directions. After The Anarchiad, Trumbull turned away from poetry and increasingly devoted his attention to law and politics. Barlow ultimately repudiated the Federalist politics of the Wits altogether. Dwight became the eighth president of Yale in 1795 and used his position as a platform from which to continue his attacks on the enemies of social order. The second generation of Wits included physician and playwright Elihu Hubbard Smith.

References

External links 
 An essay on the use and advantages of the fine arts: Delivered at the public commencement, in New-Haven. September 12, 1770

 
Culture of Yale University